Waneta (ca. 1795–1848) was a Yanktonai Dakota chief.

Waneta and Wahneta may also refer to:

People
Waneta Hoyt (1946–1998), American serial killer

Places
Wahneta, Florida, U.S.
Waneta, Kentucky, U.S.
Waneta, West Virginia, U.S.
Waneta Lake, New York, U.S.
Waneta, British Columbia, Canada
Waneta Dam, on the Pend d'Oreille River in British Columbia, Canada

Ships
Wahneta (YT-1), a United States Navy yard tug in commission from 1893 to 1920
USS Wahneta (YT-134), a United States Navy yard tug in commission from 1939 to 1946
USS Waneta (YT-384), a United States Navy harbor tug